The Attempted Rape Act 1948 (11&12 Geo. 6 c. 19) was an Act of the Parliament of the United Kingdom that increased the maximum sentence for attempted rape from 2 years' imprisonment to 7 years' penal servitude. (Penal servitude was abolished later that year by the Criminal Justice Act 1948, and replaced with imprisonment.) The Attempted Rape Act was repealed and replaced by the Sexual Offences Act 1956, which maintained the maximum sentence of 7 years' imprisonment until the 1956 Act was amended by the Sexual Offences Act 1985, which increased the maximum sentence to life imprisonment.

Full text
1. Punishment for attempted rape.—Where a person is convicted in England or Wales of an attempt to commit rape, the court shall have power to pass a sentence of penal servitude for a term of not more than seven years, in lieu of dealing with him in any other manner in which the court has power to deal with him.

2. Short title.—This Act may be cited as the Attempted Rape Act, 1948.

References
Halsbury's Statutes of England, 2nd edition, volume 5. London: Butterworth & Co (Publishers) Ltd (1948), pp. 1132-1133

English criminal law
United Kingdom Acts of Parliament 1948